On 6 March 1989, two Class 303 commuter trains crashed on the Springburn branch of the North Clyde Line, just east of Bellgrove station in the East End of Glasgow, Scotland. Driver Mr. Hugh Kennan, aged 62 of Maryhill, and passenger Mr. Robert McCaffrey, aged 58, a retired rail worker from Scotstoun, died in the crash and 53 people were injured. 

The accident was of a type known as "ding-ding, and away". It was caused primarily by a signal passed at danger (SPAD) in conjunction with the single-lead junction track layout, where two lines converged into one just beyond the platform end and then diverged again – a layout which is simpler to maintain but is vulnerable in the event of a SPAD. This type of junction has been implicated in other accidents, notably to the south-east of Glasgow in the Newton rail accident just a couple of years later. The force of the impact was so severe that at least one passenger was thrown out of his seat and completely destroyed one of the "A" frame back-to-back seats.

An official report, delivered in May 1990, determined that the -to- train had passed the signal at danger, causing a collision with the Springburn-to-Milngavie service.

References

External links
Official accident report courtesy of the Railways Archive

1989 in Scotland
Train collisions in Scotland
Railway accidents in 1989
Transport in Glasgow
Disasters in Glasgow
1980s in Glasgow
Railway accidents involving a signal passed at danger
Accidents and incidents involving Regional Railways
March 1989 events in the United Kingdom
Rail accidents caused by a driver's error